Spring Vale is a ward of Wolverhampton City Council, West Midlands, England. It is situated SSE of the city centre, on the city's border with the Metropolitan Borough of Dudley. The population of the ward taken at the 2011 census was 12,243.

Geography
As well as Dudley, Spring Vale borders the Blakenhall, Ettingshall and Bilston East wards, and forms part of the Wolverhampton South East constituency. It contains the suburbs of Ettingshall Park, Woodcross (which is actually part of the Bilston township) and Lanesfield.

History
The area has seen some regeneration in recent years, as a result of the close of the Bilston Steel Works in 1979 by British Steel Corporation. The works were a major employer for the area and the location where the first Bessemer blast furnace was installed, which allowed the invention of Tarmac using burnt coal residue. The closure of works resulted in the loss of 2,000 and the surrounding communities all witnessed a rise in unemployment and significant damage to their local economies.

Places of interest
In 1994, Blue Lamp and Tarmac Industries developed the land building Springvale Retail Park, providing new employment to local people. In 1995, Blue Lamp Business Parks Ltd. commissioned a landmark sculpture called 'Roll Down', designed and created by sculptor Robert Erskine FRBS. 'Roll Down' stands on the exact location of where the number 1 Bessemer Blast Furnace, known as Elizabeth to the steel workers, was sited. It was nominated for the Anderson Sculpture Prize. The sculpture was unveiled on 19 October 1994 by Labour MP Dennis Turner, who had worked as a steelman at the Elizabeth blast furnace. Past steel workers were invited to the ceremony and reception. 250 children from the Springvale Primary school adjacent to the sculpture, buried memory capsules beneath the sculpture. This was after a tour organised by Robert Erskine to the works in Derby where he was creating 'Roll Down', and involved the children in the project. The capsules contain poignant stories of the children's families experiencing unemployment, but also messages of thought for the future. Many children provided precious artifacts and objects from their relatives, which in time will be revealed and preserved for future generations. 'Roll Down' is designed to last a minimum of 500 years.

Also located in the ward is Spring Vale Library on Bevan Avenue.

References

Wards of Wolverhampton City Council